Grandview Heights may refer to:

Communities
Grandview Heights, Alberta, multiple locations
Grandview Heights, Surrey, a neighbourhood in Surrey, British Columbia, Canada
Grandview Heights Aquatic Centre, an indoor water park located there
Grandview Heights, New Zealand, a suburb of Hamilton, New Zealand
Grandview Heights Historic District, a neighborhood in West Palm Beach, Florida, United States
Grandview Heights, Ohio, United States, a small city
Grandview Heights High School, a school located there
Grandview Heights, Champaign County, Ohio, United States, an unincorporated community
Grandview Heights, Jefferson County, Ohio, United States, an unincorporated community